America in The Morning is a news program airing on numerous talk radio stations, syndicated by Westwood One, a subsidiary of Cumulus Media.  The one-hour live program airs weekdays at 5:00 a.m. Eastern Time and is hosted by John Trout.  The show features reports from AP Radio News, as well as a national forecast from AccuWeather, a look ahead to the day on Wall Street from CNBC and the short-form feature Offbeat.  The program originally debuted on the Mutual Broadcasting System on September 17th, 1984.  Jim Bohannon hosted the broadcast until December 2015.  At that point, Trout took over the hosting chores after Bohannon decided to cut back his schedule, concentrating on his nightly Westwood One talk show. Before his death in November 2022, Bohannon continued to contribute feature stories and interviews to America in the Morning.

A weekend version, America This Week, another former Mutual news program, is available from Westwood One.  An alternate one-hour Westwood One news program known as First Light, hosted by news anchor Michael Toscano, also airs at 5 a.m. Eastern Time.  The two broadcasts have similar formats and some reporters are heard on both programs.

References

American news radio programs
American talk radio programs
1984 radio programme debuts